Hariharpur is a village development committee in Parsa District in the Narayani Zone of southern Nepal. At the time of the 2015 Nepal census it had a population of 7480 people living in 585 individual households.

References

Populated places in Parsa District